Mill Creek is a stream in southern Miller County in the U.S. state of Missouri. It is a tributary of Grandglaize Creek.

Mill Creek was named for the fact a watermill operated at its bank.

References

Rivers of Miller County, Missouri
Rivers of Missouri